(lit. Book of the Greatness of the Sword) is a 16th-century Spanish treatise on fencing written by Don Luis Pacheco de Narváez, who is considered one of the founding fathers of Spanish fencing (destreza) and the disciple of Jerónimo Sánchez de Carranza.

About the treatise 
It must be noted that the treatise was not officially translated into English. The treatise consists of five chapters and starts with the title page which states:

"Book of the Greatness of the Sword, in which many secrets which the Commander Jerónimo de Carranza composed, are declared. One may study the book without a maestro (teacher). Dedicated to Don Philip III King of Spain, and of the greater part of the world, our lord."

The treatise was published in Madrid, Spain, on June 17, 1599. The preface includes text on official taxation, a dedication to the king and the king's appeal.

Contents

Prologue 
Luis Pacheco de Narváez persuasively discusses the skill in general, as well as the reason and evidence that  is considered a true science.

First chapter 
 Evidence that  and art of weapon handling is a science
 About Memory and service
 About prudence and duty
 Animo, honor

Second chapter 
 Demonstrations

Third chapter 
 Feints and tricks

Fourth chapter 
 Peculiarities of True

Fifth chapter 
 What a maestro shall know to practice 
 Handling a sword
 Practicing with a cloak, dagger and a sword

Criticism 

The treatise is considered by some to be a magnificent work not only about fencing, but also about the art of living for a noble man. Indeed, the treatise is written in sophisticated language with examples from geometry, mathematics, logic, Aristotelian works, Pythagorus, as well as an explanation of human temperament types and their classification.

On the other hand, certain fencing schools of past centuries considered the work of Luis Pacheco de Narváez to be pedantic work more about mathematics and calculations than practical combat. Moreover, some people consider that Pacheco simply rewrote the work of his maestro.

References

Sources 
 

Spanish books
Combat treatises
1605 books